Les Tortillards , is a French comedy film from 1960, directed by Jean Bastia, written by Pierre Gaspard-Huit, starring Jean Richard and Louis de Funès. The film was known under the titles: "Io... mio figlio e la fidanzata" (Italy), "Der Umstandskrämer" (East Germany).

Cast 
 Jean Richard : César Beauminet, manager of the theatrical troops
 Roger Pierre : Gérard Durand, the son
 Louis de Funès : Emile Durand, créateur de la bombe insecticide "Cicéron"
 Danièle Lebrun : Suzy Beauminet, daughter of César
 Madeleine Barbulée : Adélaïde Benoit, the aunt of Gérard
 Jeanne Helly : Marguerite Durand, wife of Emile
 Annick Tanguy : Fanny Raymond, the companion of César
 Robert Rollis : Ernest, a man of the troupe
 Billy Bourbon : Albert Albert, the acrobat of the troops
 Max Desrau : "Pépé", the painter of the troops
 Christian Marin : Léon, Emile's colleague
 Nono Zammit : Paulo, the props man

References

External links 
 
 Les Tortillards (1960) at the Films de France

1960 films
French comedy films
1960s French-language films
French black-and-white films
Films directed by Jean Bastia
1960s French films